Montagu Henry Toller (1 January 1871 – 5 August 1948) was an English cricketer who played for both Devon and Somerset in the late 19th century. He made six first-class appearances for Somerset, all in 1897, but was predominantly a good club cricketer. In 1900, he was part of the Devon Wanderers team that represented Great Britain in the 1900 Summer Olympics, the only time cricket has featured in the Olympics.

Life
Montagu Henry Toller was born in Barnstaple, Devon on 1 January 1871, the son of William Henry Toller. He attended Blundell's School in Tiverton, where he played for both the cricket XI and the rugby XV. Like his father before him, he became a solicitor, but after marrying Harriet Jones in 1901, he assumed joint-management of the Royal & Fortescue Hotel in Barnstaple with his new wife. He took an active role in local politics, and was elected as an independent candidate to both the County and Town Councils. He later split from his wife, who maintained management of the hotel, while Toller moved to Brighton where he once again practiced as a solicitor. He died after a short illness in Meon Beach, Titchfield, Hampshire, on 5 August 1948, aged 77.

Sporting career
Toller was described in an article about him in the Western Evening Herald as being "an adept" at both rugby and cricket, and was an all-round sportsman who also played tennis, golf and billiards to a respectable level. At cricket, Toller was a right-handed batsman and right-arm fast bowler, with a strong and sturdy physique. He was described by the Somerset cricket historian Stephen Hill as a prominent club cricketer who was a "leading light" for the Devon and Somerset Wanderers. He played second-class cricket for Devon between 1889 and 1895, during which time he was presented with many awards for his bowling and batting performances. During 1895 he was invited to play for W. G. Grace's team towards the end of the season, in which he scored 41 runs in the first innings. He had a successful trial with Somerset in 1897, in which he scored 33 runs for "Sammy Woods' XI", and he subsequently made six first-class appearances for the county that season as an amateur. Hill describes his usage for Somerset as strange; in club cricket Toller was best regarded for his fast bowling, and yet he only bowled once for Somerset, taking one wicket for 15 runs against Philadelphia. By the end of the 1897 season, Cricket magazine said that he had "proved an entire failure" for Somerset.

His obituary in the North Devon Journal praised his rugby prowess for Barnstaple RFC, one of the prominent clubs in the south-west at the time. He played as a three-quarter back, and was also capped at county level for Devon, for whom he first appeared in 1889. In the 1894–95 season, he achieved the rare feat of scoring three drop goals in one match for Barnstaple. He was offered the captaincy of Barnstaple more than once, but declined it on each occasion.

Olympics

Toller was a member of the gold medal-winning Great Britain cricket team at the 1900 Summer Olympics, the only time cricket has featured in the Olympics. In the only game, against France, he scored two runs in the Great Britain first innings and did not bat in the second. He took seven wickets, all of them bowled, while conceding only nine runs in the French second innings, helping Great Britain to victory with just five minutes to spare in the match.

Notes

References

External links

1871 births
People educated at Blundell's School
1948 deaths
English cricketers
English Olympic medallists
Somerset cricketers
Devon cricketers
Olympic cricketers of Great Britain
Cricketers at the 1900 Summer Olympics
Olympic gold medallists for Great Britain
Medalists at the 1900 Summer Olympics
Sportspeople from Barnstaple
English solicitors